Bangladesh is a major shipbuilding nation. It has a long history of shipbuilding. The industry has been growth in recent years when locally made ships began to be exported. Bangladesh has now over 200 shipbuilding companies, mostly concentrated in Dhaka, Chittagong, Narayanganj, Barisal and Khulna. Some of the leading shipbuilding companies of Bangladesh include Ananda Shipyard & Slipways Limited, FMC Dockyard Limited, Western Marine Shipyard, Chittagong Dry Dock Limited, Khulna Shipyard and Dockyard and Engineering Works.

History 

Due to the riverine geography of Bangladesh, ships have been playing a major role in the trade affairs of the people of this country since the ancient times. According to the accounts of the 14th century Moroccan traveler Ibn Batuta, there used to be large fleets of warships docked in various ports of the country. A medieval European traveler Caesar Frederick documented that the port city of Chittagong and Sandwip were  manufacturing hubs of large ships during the mid 15th century. The volume of shipbuilding swelled extensively during the Mughal period. During the 17th century, the shipyards of Chittagong and Sandwip used to build warships for the Sultan of Turkey.

Mughal era 

During the Mughal Empire, the province of Bengal Subah had a large shipbuilding industry. Economic historian Indrajit Ray estimates shipbuilding output of Bengal during the sixteenth and seventeenth centuries at 223,250 tons annually, compared with 23,061 tons produced in nineteen colonies in North America from 1769 to 1771. He also assesses ship repairing as very advanced in Bengal.

Bengali shipbuilding was advanced compared to European shipbuilding at the time. An important innovation in shipbuilding was the introduction of a flushed deck design in Bengal rice ships, resulting in hulls that were stronger and less prone to leak than the structurally weak hulls of traditional European ships built with a stepped deck design. The British East India Company later duplicated the flushed deck and hull designs of Bengal rice ships in the 1760s, leading to significant improvements in seaworthiness and navigation for European ships during the Industrial Revolution.

Modern era 
The Royal Navy had many warships built in Chittagong, some of which were also used in the Battle of Trafalgar in 1805. Dockyard and Engineering Works Limited, the first modern shipyard of Bangladesh, was established in 1922, constructed during the British era in the subcontinent. After the liberation war in 1971, the dockyard was nationalized under the ministry of industries. Later it came under the control of Bangladesh Navy in 2006.

In 1979, the sector received its first foreign investment after the independence of Bangladesh when Mitsui Engineering and Shipbuilding Industry, a Japanese enterprise, formed a joint venture with High Speed Shipyard of Bangladesh to establish a shipyard at Fatullah, Narayanganj. By the 2000s, several more private shipyards were established and in 2008, Bangladesh became a ship exporting country.

Industry 

Ananda Shipyard and Shipways Limited (ASSL), founded in 1983 on the bank of Meghna river, became the first Bangladeshi shipbuilding company to export an ocean-going ship when it transferred the locally built "Stella Maris" to a Danish firm. ASSL has since then secured several more contracts, mostly from the European countries. Western Marine Shipyard is another company, based in Chittagong, which has secured many export contracts. There is also another shipbuilding company and they have the third largest shipyard in Bangladesh and it is situated in Meghna.The company's name is Khan Brothers Shipbuilding Limited.  FMC Dockyard Limited is one of the renowned name in Bangladeshi shipbuilding industry. This is the only Dockyard of Bangladesh, which has its own forward and backward linkage facilities.  

The potentials of shipbuilding in Bangladesh has made the country to be compared with countries like China, Japan and South Korea. Referring to the growing amount of export deals secured by the shipbuilding companies as well as the low cost labor available in the country, experts suggest that Bangladesh could emerge as a major competitor in the global market of small to medium ocean-going vessels.

See also
Khulna Shipyard
Dockyard and Engineering Works Limited
Ananda Shipyard and Shipways Limited
Western Marine Shipyard
FMC Dockyard Limited

References

Bangladesh
Industry in Bangladesh
Shipping in Bangladesh